BBS PG College (Post Graduate College), Rajesultanpur is a multi-streamed college in India. It was established in 1955 by Gopbandhu Mishra. Normally it is known by its abbreviation Bharti College. It is post graduate college and affiliated to Sampurnanand Sanskrit Vishwavidyalaya University, Faizabad. It was started with the object of imparting modern education to the students in a manner that conserves their religion, language, script and culture. The college is owned and managed by Hinduism Educational Society, Rajesultnpur, a charitable religious society

This institution is situated in Rajesultanpur a city of Uttar Pradesh in the Faizabad division. It is equipped with laboratories, lecture rooms, central library, wooden badminton courts, auditorium, cultural and heritage research centre and extensive playgrounds for football, hockey, cricket with athletics, and a computer lab.

Courses Offered

Under Graduate Courses
Bachelor of Arts (B.A.)
Bachelor of Science (B.Sc.)
Bachelor of Computer Application (B.C.A.)
Bachelor of Commerce (B.Com.)
Bachelor of Business Administration (BBA)
Bachelor of Education (B.Ed.)
Bachelor of Library and Information Science (B.Lib.I.S.)

Post Graduate Courses
Master of Arts (M.A.)
Master of Science (M.Sc.)
Master of Social Work (M.S.W.)

Diploma/ Certification Courses
Post Graduate Diploma in Computer Application (P.G.D.C.A.)
Post Graduate Diploma in Computer Programming (P.G.D.C.P.)
Post Graduate Diploma in Journalism and Mass Communication (P.G.D.J.M.C.)
Computer Literacy Programme (C.L.P.)

Research Programmes

Faculties

Faculty of Arts
Faculty of Arts comprises following departments
Department of Sanskrit
Department of English
Department of Hindi
Department of Persian
Department of Davangari
Department of Drawing & Painting
Department of Economics
Department of Education
Department of History
Department of Geography
Department of Philosophy
Department of Psychology
Department of Sociology
Department of Journalism & Mass Communication
Department of Social Work

Faculty of Science
Department of Botany
Department of Chemistry
Department of Mathematics
Department of Statistics
Department of Zoology
Department of Bio-Technology & Microbiology

Faculty of Commerce
Department of Commerce
Department of Business Administration

Faculty of Education
Department of Education
Department of B.Ed.

Faculty of IT
Department of Computer Science
Department of Library & Information Science

References

Postgraduate colleges in Uttar Pradesh
Colleges in Ambedkar Nagar district
Rajesultanpur
Educational institutions established in 1955
1955 establishments in Uttar Pradesh